Union of Democratic Forces for Unity (UFDR) was a rebel group which fought against the government in the Central African Republic Bush War.  The Central African Republic has accused the UFDR of being backed by the government of Sudan.

On April 13, 2007, a peace agreement between the government and the UFDR was signed in Birao. The agreement provides for an amnesty for the UFDR, its recognition as a political party, and the eventual integration of its fighters into the army.

References

Central African Republic Bush War
Factions of the Central African Republic Civil War
Rebel groups in the Central African Republic